Decker Lake may refer to:

Decker Lake (British Columbia), a lake near the town of Burns Lake, British Columbia, Canada
Decker Lake, British Columbia, a community on that lake
Decker Lake (UTA station)
 Decker Lake, a man-made lake in West Valley City, Utah, United States
Decker Lake (Le Sueur County, Minnesota)

See also
Decker (disambiguation)